Simon Cooper may refer to:

People
Simon Cooper (banker) (born 1967)
Simon Cooper (British Army officer) (born 1936)
Simon Cooper (writer), shortlisted for Wainwright Prize 2017

Characters
Simon Cooper (fictional character), a character from the British comedy The Inbetweeners